Javier Berasaluce Marquiegui (4 January 1931 – 8 February 2022) was a Spanish footballer who played as a goalkeeper. He played in La Liga with Deportivo Alavés, Real Madrid and Racing de Santander. He died on 8 February 2022, at the age of 91.

Career
Berasaluce began playing football as a right winger while studying at the Salesianos de Deusto in Bilbao. After his club's regular goalkeeper was injured, Berasaluce began playing goalkeeper. He played football for his hometown club Amaikak Bat, before turning professional.

Berasaluce began his professional career with Deportivo Alavés, helping the club win the 1953–54 Segunda División and earn promotion to La Liga. He also was part of the Real Madrid squad that won five European Cups and La Liga twice.

References

1931 births
2022 deaths
Spanish footballers
Association football goalkeepers
La Liga players
Segunda División players
Deportivo Alavés players
Real Madrid CF players
Racing de Santander players
Sportspeople from Gipuzkoa
People from Debabarrena